Bomb at 10:10 is a 1967 Yugoslavian war film directed by Caslav Damjanovic and starring George Montgomery.

Premise
An American P.O.W. works with Yugoslav partisans to assassinate an SS Colonel and concentration camp Commandant.

Cast
 George Montgomery as Maj. Steve Corbett
 Rada Djuricin as Pia Fermich
 Branko Plesa as Col. Hassler
 Rade Markovic as Marko
 Phil Brown as Professor Pilic
 Ljuba Tadic as Andrey
 Aleksandar Gavric as Dragan
 Pavle Vujisic as Man with the glasses
 Ingrid Lotarius as Mira
 Petar Banicevic as Lt. Voss
 Dusan Tadic as Mile
 Radmilo Curcic as Train Conductor (uncredited)

Production
The film was shot in Yugoslavia in 1966.

References

External links
 
 Bomb at 10:10 at BFI
 Review of film at the Movie Scene

1967 films
1967 war films
Yugoslav war films
Films set in Yugoslavia
War films set in Partisan Yugoslavia
Yugoslav World War II films
1960s English-language films
English-language Yugoslav films